Grama Kanya is a 1936 Hindi melodrama film directed by Sarvottam Badami. The film produced by Sagar Movietone had cinematography by Faredoon Irani, story by Jayant Shyam and dialogue by Waqif. The music was composed by the renowned bhajan singer Shankarrao Khatu. The cast included Surendra, Sabita Devi, Yakub, Aruna, Kayam Ali, and Gulzar.

The story is about a young man, Kumar (Surendra), who loves a girl, Vilas (Aruna), but has to marry another Bansari (Sabita Devi), due to family obligations. The film follows the complications arising from the situation.

Plot
Kumar (Surendra ) comes to the city from his village to study in college. His father has been sanctioned a loan from the rich Dinanath (Kayam Ali) to enable Kumar to study. Dinanath gives the loan on the basis of Kumar marrying his daughter Bansari (Sabita Devi). Kumar is in love with another girl Vilas (Aruna), and wants to marry her. Parental obligations and duty make him forgo Vilas who is pregnant and marry Bansari. The story continues with the accidental killing of his father by Kumar, and Vilas' narrative from thereon.

Cast
 Sabita Devi as Bansari
 Surendra as Kumar
 Yakub as Vinod
 Aruna as Vilas
 Kayam Ali as Dinanath
 Gulzar
 Sankatha Prasad
 Baby Indira
 Pande
 Jamu Patel

Music 
The music director was the renowned bhajan singer Shankarrao Khatu. According to Ranade, the songs from the film like "Tulsi Mata Pyari" and "Kanhaiya Bansiwale Re" became popular. There were nine songs in the film and the singers were Surendra, Rajkumari and Sabita Devi.

Soundtrack

References

External links

1936 films
1930s Hindi-language films
Indian drama films
1936 drama films
Indian black-and-white films
Melodrama films
Hindi-language drama films